Spiteri is a common Maltese surname. There are two theories regarding the origin of this surname. One theory states that it has derived from the Italian word Ospitalieri, meaning Hospitallers.  Another theory states that the surname has derived from the latin term Spatharius,  meaning sword-bearer. Notable people with the surname include:

Carm Lino Spiteri (1932–2008), Maltese architect and politician
Dalila Spiteri (born 1997), Italian tennis player
Donat Spiteri (1922–2011), Maltese religious leader and author
Joe Spiteri (born 1973), Maltese Australian footballer
Joseph Spiteri (born 1959), Maltese prelate
Joseph M. Spiteri (1934–2013), Maltese architect
Kirsten Spiteri (born 1987), Maltese writer
Lino Spiteri (1938–2014), Maltese writer and politician
Mary Spiteri (born 1947), Maltese cabaret artiste
Nolwenn Spiteri (born 2001), Maltese princess
Michael Spiteri (born 1969), Maltese footballer
Oliver Spiteri (born 1970), Maltese football manager and former player
Renzo Spiteri, Maltese musician
Sharleen Spiteri (born 1967), Scottish singer-songwriter; guitarist; lead vocalist of the pop-rock band Texas
Sharleen Spiteri (died 2005), Australian sex worker
Stephen C. Spiteri (born 1963), Maltese military historian
Suzanne Spiteri (born 1978), Maltese sprinter
Vicente Spiteri (1917–2003), Spanish conductor
Myriam Spiteri Debono (born 1952), Maltese politician
Ernest Spiteri-Gonzi (born 1955), Maltese footballer
Miguel Juan Spiteri (born 2003), Maltese footballer

References

Maltese-language surnames